Xenia High School is a public high school in Xenia, Ohio, United States.

History
The circa 1957 high school was destroyed by an F5 tornado on April 3, 1974, during what was dubbed the 1974 Super Outbreak. A replacement building was constructed in the north of the city. Students from the high school and several other schools were relocated to Warner Middle School for three years until the new school was built.

Notable alumni
 Doug Adams, former professional football player
 Barry Clemens, former professional basketball player
 Trent Cole, former defensive end for the Indianapolis Colts
 Paul Huston, former professional basketball player
 Bret Jones, former professional soccer player
 David Levering Lewis, history professor at New York University and twice winner of the Pulitzer Prize

Sports
The school's mascot is the Buccaneer and its colors are blue and white. The school's fight song is "Hoorah for Xenia High School." Jack Harbaugh was the head football coach for one year, in 1966. As of 2019-20, the Bucs are members of the Miami Valley League (MVL).

State championships

 Boys Basketball – 1942

References

External links
 District Website
 School Website

High schools in Greene County, Ohio
Xenia, Ohio
Public high schools in Ohio